743 (seven hundred [and] forty three) is the natural number following 742 and preceding 744. It is a prime number.

743 is a Sophie Germain prime, because 2 × 743 + 1 = 1487 is also prime.

743 is an emirp, because 347 (the reversal of its digits) is prime.

There are exactly 743 independent sets in a four-dimensional (16 vertex) hypercube graph, and exactly 743 connected cubic graphs with 16 vertices and girth four.

References

Integers